The 1989/90 FIS Nordic Combined World Cup was the seventh World Cup season, a combination of ski jumping and cross-country skiing organized by International Ski Federation. It started on 16 Dec 1989 in St. Moritz, Switzerland and ended on 16 March 1990 in Oslo, Norway.

Calendar

Men

Standings

Overall 

Standings after 9 events.

Nations Cup 

Standings after 9 events.

References

External links
FIS Nordic Combined World Cup 1989/90 

1989 in Nordic combined
1990 in Nordic combined
FIS Nordic Combined World Cup